Lillian Jean McGeoch (born Lillian Jean McKittrick; 17 January 1903 – 1992) was a Canadian painter and sculptor.

Lillian Jean McKittrick was born in Sundridge, Ontario on 17 January 1903.
Her parents were Edward James McKittrick and Ida Caroline Curran.
The Rev. E.J. McKittrick was an Algoma clergyman.
McKittrick studied under John William Beatty and George Agnew Reid at the Ontario College of Art.
She also studied art at the Port Hope summer school, and with groups of artists in Toronto, Nova Scotia and Rockport, Maine.
She won two scholarships in succession while studying under Alfred Howell (1889–1978) at the Toronto Central Technical School.

On 24 April 1926 McKittrick married Rae McGeoch, a sales manager in Toronto.
She worked as a freelance commercial artist and taught art.
She mainly painted oil and tempera landscapes and still life studies.
She also worked with metal, clay and wood.
McGeoch had solo exhibitions in Halifax, Nova Scotia (1950), the Toronto Lyceum Club (1957), the Women’s Art Association, Toronto (1961), Richview Library, Toronto (1967, 1969), Newport Hotel, Clarkson, Mississauga (1968) and the Douglas Art Gallery, Toronto.

She died in 1992 and is buried with her husband, Rae McGeoch (1898–1993), in King City Cemetery, King City, Ontario.

References

Sources

1903 births
1992 deaths
Canadian sculptors
20th-century sculptors
20th-century Canadian painters
Canadian women sculptors
20th-century Canadian women artists
Canadian women painters
20th-century Canadian sculptors